Bernardos is a municipality located in the province of Segovia, Castile and León, Spain. According to the 2015 census (INE), the municipality has a population of 547 inhabitants. The nearest town (1 km away) is Migueláñez.

Locations
Bernardos has a plaza with many bars and a pool at the edge of town that is also used by the people surrounding Bernardos.

References

Municipalities in the Province of Segovia